The Brown Building is a ten-story building that is part of the campus of New York University (NYU), which owns it. It is located at 23–29 Washington Place, between Greene Street and Washington Square East in the Greenwich Village neighborhood of Manhattan, New York City, and is best known as the location of the March 25, 1911, Triangle Shirtwaist Factory fire, which killed 146 people.

The building was listed on the National Register of Historic Places and was named a National Historical Landmark in 1991. It was designated a New York City landmark in 2003.

History
The iron and steel building was constructed in 1900–01, and was designed by John Woolley in the neo-Renaissance style. It was named the Asch Building after its owner, Joseph J. Asch. During that time, the Asch Building was known for its "fireproof" rooms, which attracted many garment makers, including the Triangle Shirtwaist Factory, which was the site of the Triangle Shirtwaist Factory fire that killed 146 garment workers on March 25, 1911.

The majority of the workers who occupied the Asch Building were female immigrants. The immigrants came to the United States for a better life, although they were working in terrible conditions within the factory and were underpaid. The building's top three floors were occupied by the Triangle Shirtwaist Factory, owned by Russian immigrants Max Blanck and Isaac Harris.

Even though the immigrants were provided a job, their work environment was not safe. Rooms were overcrowded with few working bathrooms and no ventilation, resulting in conditions ranging from sweltering heat to freezing cold. In regard to working conditions, the Asch Building at the time did not comply with several requirements that were needed to ensure the safety of the building. The rooms in the upper three floors were packed with flammable objects, including clothing products hanging from lines above workers' heads, rows of tightly spaced sewing machines, cutting tables bearing bolts of cloth, and linen and cotton cuttings littering the floors, that resulted in a massive spread of fire occurring in the matter of seconds. The building had a single fire escape  that was not durable enough to hold many people, and there were no sprinklers installed in the building. The rooms on each floor were overcrowded because there was no limit at the time as to how many people could occupy one floor. The staircases did not have landings and the stairwells were poorly illuminated, resulting in unsafe, often dark conditions in the stairwells.

A survivor of this incident indicated that there had been a blue glow coming from a bin under a table where 120 layers of fabric had just been stacked prior to cutting. Fire rose from the bin, ignited the tissue paper templates hung from the ceiling, and spread across the room. Once ignited, the tissue paper floated off haphazardly from table to table, setting off fires as it went. Many people died during the fire, some from inhaling thick smoke or from being burned in the fire. Others died because they jumped out the building's windows to escape the flames – the interior stairs were blocked and the elevators stopped functioning properly because of the heat. Workers piled up at the entrance of the stairway because the stairway (which had no landing) was too dark for one to see his or her way down the steps. In the panic during the fire many people were crushed to death from behind while workers were attempting to get through the locked doors. As for the elevators, the owners and their family went into the elevator, which only could have held twelve people and escaped the building. In request of the owner, they told the elevator operator to send the elevator back up; however, by the time the elevator made its way back, the fire was fully engaged on the eighth floor and quickly spreading to the ninth. This had forced the workers to jump out the windows and jump into the elevator shaft that was nine stories down. Although there was the option of using the fire escape to get out of the burning building, few managed to escape this way. With many workers going through the fire escape, the fire escape eventually collapsed. Prior to the fire escape collapsing, people still could not make it to the ground safely, because the ladder from the fire escape did not reach the ground, nor was it close enough for people to jump down, which led to many more deaths.

The New York City Fire Department did not have the proper equipment to battle the fire, such as the ladder, which “could only reach the sixth floor, fully two floors below the level of fire". The factory owners Max Blanck and Isaac Harris were charged with “criminal negligence”, and faced multiple lawsuits from the victims’ families. As a result of this fire, there were several new building and safety regulations, “such as mandatory fire drills, periodic fire inspections, working fire hoses, sprinklers, exit signs and fire alarms, doors that swung in the direction of travel and stairway size restrictions.”
The fire led to wide-ranging legislation requiring improved factory safety standards and helped spur the growth of the International Ladies' Garment Workers' Union. The building survived the fire and was refurbished. Three plaques on the southeast corner of the building commemorate the women and men who lost their lives in the fire.

NYU began to use the eighth floor of the building for a library and classrooms in 1916. Real estate speculator and philanthropist Frederick Brown later bought the building and subsequently donated it to the university in 1929, when it was renamed the Brown Building. In 2002, the building was incorporated into the Silver Center for Arts and Science.

Current use
The Brown building is currently owned by New York University. It is internally connected to the adjacent Silver Center and Waverly buildings, and make up the "Main Block" of NYU.  It now houses classrooms, study spaces, and many research labs of the NYU Chemistry and Biology Departments.

See also

List of National Historic Landmarks in New York City
List of New York City Designated Landmarks in Manhattan below 14th Street
National Register of Historic Places listings in Manhattan below 14th Street

References
Notes

External links

Triangle Fire Open Archive: Landmark Designation, Brown/Asch Building

Office buildings completed in 1901
Industrial buildings completed in 1901
Triangle Shirtwaist Factory fire
National Historic Landmarks in Manhattan
New York City Designated Landmarks in Manhattan
Buildings and structures on the National Register of Historic Places in Manhattan
New York University
1901 establishments in New York City